The canton of Veynes is an administrative division in southeastern France. Since the French canton reorganisation which came into effect in March 2015, the canton consists of the following 8 communes:
Châteauneuf-d'Oze
Dévoluy
Furmeyer
Manteyer
Montmaur
Rabou
La Roche-des-Arnauds
Veynes

Demographics

See also
Cantons of the Hautes-Alpes department 
Communes of France

References

Cantons of Hautes-Alpes